The Players Championship (commonly known as simply The Players, stylized by the PGA Tour as The PLAYERS Championship) is an annual golf tournament on the PGA Tour. Originally known as the Tournament Players Championship, it began in 1974. The Players Championship at one point offered the highest purse of any tournament in golf (from $12.5 million in 2019 up to $20 million in 2022). The field usually includes the top 50 players in the world rankings, but unlike the major championships and World Golf Championships events, it is owned by the PGA Tour and not an official event on other tours. 

Despite not being a major, it has been promoted as such by the tour, dubbed the fifth major, and is often regarded as the next most prestigious tournament in golf. This is because of the characteristics it shares with the majors, such as the high class field and its large purse. It also has a renowned host course in Ponte Vedra Beach, Florida (the TPC at Sawgrass Stadium Course at which the tournament has been played since 1982, home of the iconic par-3 No. 17 "Island Green").

Format 
As of 2023, the victor receives $4.5 million, the winner's share (18%) of the largest purse in golf ($25 million), and receives 80 points towards his world ranking, the largest share aside from the majors, for which winners earn 100 points. For comparison, the winners of the four individual World Golf Championships generally receive between 70 and 78 points.

The winner also receives a five-year exemption on the PGA Tour (formerly ten years), a three-year invitation to the Masters Tournament, three-year exemptions for the U.S. Open and The Open Championship, and an exemption to the next three PGA Championship tournaments starting in 2018. The winner earns 600 FedEx Cup points, if a PGA Tour member.

Field 
The field consists of 144 players consisting of the following criteria:

Winners of PGA Tour events since last Players
Top 125 from previous season's FedEx Cup points list
Top 125 (medical)
Major champions from the past five years
Players Championship winners from the past five years
The Tour Championship winners from the past three years
World Golf Championship winners from the past three years
Memorial Tournament, Arnold Palmer Invitational and Genesis Invitational winners from the past three years
Top 50 from the Official World Golf Ranking
Senior Players Championship champion from prior year
Korn Ferry Tour money leader from prior season
Money leader during the Korn Ferry Tour Finals, if not the regular-season money leader
Top 10 current year FedEx Cup points leaders 
Remaining positions and alternates filled from the current season FedEx Cup standings

History 
The Players Championship was conceived by the PGA Tour commissioner Deane Beman; the inaugural event in 1974 was played at Atlanta Country Club in Marietta, Georgia, concluding on Labor Day weekend in early September. It moved to Texas for 1975, at the Colonial Country Club in Fort Worth in August, and then to south Florida for 1976 at Inverrary Country Club in Lauderhill, at its East Course in late February. In these first three years the event replaced existing events, the Atlanta Classic in 1974, the Colonial National Invitational in 1975 and the Jackie Gleason-Inverrary Classic in 1976, which each returned to the schedule the following year.

In 1976 the PGA Tour agreed a multi-year deal to play the event up the coast at Sawgrass Country Club in Ponte Vedra Beach in mid-March, beginning in 1977. Since 1982, it has been played across the road to the west, at the Stadium Course at TPC at Sawgrass. The word "Tournament" was dropped from the title following the 1987 event.

Following the 2006 event, the course underwent a major renovation, which received very positive reviews from the players in 2007. Included in the renovation was a new  Mediterranean Revival-style clubhouse.

The 2020 Players Championship was cancelled due to the COVID-19 pandemic.

Five players have won The Players and a major championship in the same calendar year: Jack Nicklaus (1978, Open), Hal Sutton (1983, PGA), Tiger Woods (2001, Masters), Martin Kaymer (2014, U.S. Open), and Cameron Smith (2022, Open).

Move to May
For the first thirty years at Ponte Vedra Beach, the championship was played in mid- to late March, several weeks before The Masters. (Three weeks prior for the first six seasons  then two weeks prior in 1983.) It was moved to May in 2007, to the weekend including the second Saturday, as part of a restructuring of the PGA Tour. This restructuring involved the introduction of the lucrative FedEx Cup, which concludes with The Tour Championship. The change gave the PGA Tour a marquee event in six consecutive months (The Masters in April, The Players in May, the U.S. Open in June, The Open Championship in July, the PGA Championship in August, and the Tour Championship in September).

With the rearrangement of 2007, the final round of The Players Championship was usually on the second Sunday of May, Mother's Day in the United States. To mark this, most players wore pink shirts or accessories on Sunday, and many in the galleries also joined them in donning pink garb. (The two exceptions were in 2011 and 2016, when the final round was on Sunday, May 15.)

In August 2017, it was announced that The Players would return to March beginning in 2019, due to a realignment of the golf season that moves the PGA Championship from August to May.

Playoffs
The playoff format was sudden-death through 2013, lately starting at the par-3 17th hole. The format was changed to a three-hole aggregate in 2014, similar to the PGA Championship, played over the final three holes, in order. If still tied, the playoff goes to sudden-death on the same three holes, but starts at the 17th.

Since moving to the Stadium Course in 1982, only four playoffs have been necessary (1987, 2008, 2011, 2015). The 1987 playoff started at the par-5 16th and went to a third extra hole at the par-4 18th, with three pars by the winner; the next two ended at the first extra hole (17), also with pars by the victors. (The only playoff prior to the Stadium Course was in 1981; it also ended on the first hole with a par by the winner.)

The 2015 playoff was the first for the three-hole aggregate and included three participants; two birdied 17 and the other player was eliminated after three holes. It went to sudden-death at 17 and became the first playoff at the Players to end with a birdie.

Defending champions
The Players has yet to produce a successful title defense; victories in consecutive years. Jack Nicklaus won three of the first five events, but in alternating years on different courses. Since moving to TPC Sawgrass in 1982, five players have won twice, but the shortest span between victories is six years (Steve Elkington: 1991, 1997).

The best finish by a defending champion is a tie for fifth place (1977, 1990, 2001) and the closest margin is four strokes behind (1977, 1981, 1989, 2005). The defending champion has missed the cut ten times, most recently in 2021, and has not participated (for health reasons) on three occasions (1983, 1998, 2014). The most recent top-ten finish was in 2005, a tie for eighth place.

Venues

Course lengths

 Par 72, except for 1975 (par 70)

Winners

Note: Green highlight indicates scoring records.
Source:

Multiple winners
Six players have won the tournament more than once:

3 wins:
Jack Nicklaus: 1974, 1976, 1978
2 wins: 
Fred Couples: 1984, 1996 
Steve Elkington: 1991, 1997 
Hal Sutton: 1983, 2000 
Davis Love III: 1992, 2003 
Tiger Woods: 2001, 2013

Each of Nicklaus' three victories were at different courses but none were at the Stadium Course, where the other multiple winners won both their titles. The shortest span between wins at the Stadium Course is six years (Elkington) and the longest is seventeen years (Sutton).

Tournament highlights

1974: Jack Nicklaus wins the inaugural edition of the tournament. He beats J. C. Snead by two shots near Atlanta.
1977: Mark Hayes wins by two shots over Mike McCullough at Sawgrass Country Club, despite shooting the highest winning score on the PGA Tour, 289, since Nicklaus at the 1972 U.S. Open. 
1978: Jack Nicklaus wins his third Tournament Players Championship title. He edges Lou Graham by one shot.
1979: Bob Murphy, a five-time winner on the PGA Tour, shoots a final round 92. Winds were gusting up to 45 miles per hour that day.
1980: Playing in a final threesome with Gary Player and Jack Nicklaus, Lee Trevino shoots a final round 70 to edge Ben Crenshaw by one shot. 
1981: Raymond Floyd defeats Curtis Strange and Barry Jaeckel on the first hole of a sudden death playoff. In addition to the tournament title, Floyd collects an additional $250,000 bonus due to his win at the Doral-Eastern Open the week before.
1982: After winning the first tournament at the Stadium Course by two shots over Brad Bryant and Scott Simpson, Jerry Pate tosses PGA Tour Commissioner Deane Beman and course architect Pete Dye into the water adjacent to the 18th green before jumping in himself.
1983: Hal Sutton wins by one shot over Bob Eastwood. John Cook came to the 72nd hole tied for the lead with Sutton before hitting his tee shot in the water on his way to a double bogey.
1984: Fred Couples shoots a course record 64 during the second round of play on his way to a one-shot victory over Lee Trevino. 
1986: John Mahaffey wins by one shot over Larry Mize after Mize makes bogey on four of the last five holes during the final round of play.
1987: Sandy Lyle defeats Jeff Sluman with a par on the third hole of a sudden-death playoff. At the playoff's second hole, Sluman stood over a  birdie putt to win, and a spectator jumped into the water surrounding the 17th green. He backed away, then missed.
1988: Jacksonville area resident Mark McCumber wins by four shots over Mike Reid.
1989: Tom Kite wins for the second consecutive week. He beats Chip Beck by one shot.
1991: Steve Elkington wins by one shot over Fuzzy Zoeller. Phil Blackmar had solo possession of the lead before hitting his tee shot into the water on the 71st hole resulting in a double bogey.
1992: Mark Calcavecchia and John Daly, the first pair on the final day of the tournament, are reprimanded by Deputy PGA Tour Commissioner Tim Finchem "for failure to exert their best effort" after they finish their 18 holes of golf in only two hours and three minutes.
1994: Greg Norman shoots the 72-hole record score for the tournament, 264, on his way to a four shot victory over Fuzzy Zoeller.
1995: After Norman's record score, the course is made tougher by the creation of new, rock hard greens. Lee Janzen shoots 283 to win the tournament, the biggest one-year swing for a tournament played on the same layout in PGA Tour history. 
1996: Twelve years after his first win at the TPC at Sawgrass, Fred Couples triumphs again. He shoots a final round 64 to beat Colin Montgomerie and Tommy Tolles by four shots.
1999: David Duval wins by two shots over Scott Gump. The win by Duval propels him to No. 1 in the World rankings.
2000: Hal Sutton wins at the TPC at Sawgrass for a second time. He edges Tiger Woods by one shot.
2002: Playing for the first time ever in The Players Championship, Craig Perks finishes eagle-birdie-par to win by two shots over Stephen Ames. It is the only PGA Tour win for Perks.
2003: Davis Love III wins The Players Championship for a second time. He shoots a final round 64 to win by six shots over Jay Haas and Pádraig Harrington.
2004: In spite of hitting his 2nd shot at the 72nd hole into the water, Adam Scott is able to get it up and down for bogey to win by one shot over Pádraig Harrington.
2005: Fred Funk becomes the tournament's oldest champion by edging Tom Lehman, Luke Donald, and Scott Verplank by one shot. During the final round, Bob Tway hits four balls into the water surrounding the 17th green, scoring a twelve on the hole.
2010: After 206 career PGA Tour starts, Tim Clark breaks through for his first Tour win.
2011: K. J. Choi becomes the first Asian born golfer to win The Players Championship. He defeats David Toms on the first hole of a sudden death playoff.
2013: Roberto Castro ties the course record with a 9-under 63 in the opening round. Sergio García, tied for the lead with Tiger Woods at 13-under par going to the par-3 17th hole in the final round, puts two balls into the water. Tiger Woods wins the event for the first time since 2001. It is his 78th career PGA Tour win in his 300th start.
2014: Ongoing injuries prevent Tiger Woods from defending his title. In the first round, Martin Kaymer ties the course record with a 63 matching Fred Couples (1992), Greg Norman (1994) and Roberto Castro (2013). Kaymer goes on to win wire-to-wire.
2015: Following a three-way tie at 12-under par in regulation play, the tournament's first aggregate three-hole playoff over holes 16–18 is conducted between Rickie Fowler, Kevin Kisner and Sergio García. Kisner and Fowler both go par-birdie-par to end the playoff at 1-under par, while García can only muster three pars to finish at even par and is eliminated. The playoff continues into sudden death, starting at the 17th, where both Kisner and Fowler have birdie opportunities. Kisner's birdie try from about 12 feet is unsuccessful, while Fowler's effort, inside of five feet, drops home for the victory.
2017: 21-year-old Kim Si-woo becomes the event's youngest winner.
2020: The tournament was canceled due to the COVID-19 pandemic. The first round had been played. Hideki Matsuyama led, having tied the course record with a score of 63 (−9). Half of the $15 million purse was distributed to the players who played the first round, $52,000 each.

Gallery

References

External links

Coverage on the PGA Tour's official site
TPC at Sawgrass official site
Results at golfstats.com

 
Annual sporting events in the United States
Recurring sporting events established in 1974
1974 establishments in Georgia (U.S. state)